Pennsauken–Route 73 station is a station on NJ Transit's River Line light rail system, located on River Road in Pennsauken Township, in Camden County, New Jersey, United States.

The station opened on March 15, 2004. Southbound service from the station is available to Camden, New Jersey. Northbound service is available to the Trenton Rail Station with connections to NJ Transit trains to New York City, SEPTA trains to Philadelphia, Pennsylvania, and Amtrak trains. Transfer to the PATCO Speedline is available at the Walter Rand Transportation Center. Transfer to the Atlantic City Line is available at the Pennsauken Transit Center.

Park and ride service is available at this station, as are some NJ Transit and South Jersey Transportation Authority buses. Despite being partially named for Route 73, the station is located not only west of Route 73, but also west of the Pennsauken Creek. The closest resemblance to an encounter with Route 73 is a bridge built over the road from the days when the line was owned by the Pennsylvania Railroad.

Transfers 
New Jersey Transit buses: 419
SJTA bus

References

External links

River Line stations
Railway stations in the United States opened in 2004
2004 establishments in New Jersey
Transportation in Camden County, New Jersey
Pennsauken Township, New Jersey